TR (Technische Revue) is a monthly German magazine launched in 1982 for industry professionals. It is published by Thomas Industrial Media GmbH, a subsidiary of Thomas Industrial Media BVBA, whose offices are located in Mechelen, Belgium, as well as also being present in France, Italy and Turkey.

Information
Published 10 times a year, TR provides a digest of the latest product news and technologies available on the German market. In 2009, TR had nearly 40,000 subscribers, mostly engineers and purchasing managers. TR also publishes newsletters and updates its website with daily news about new products and services available to the German market.

TR has been published in Super A4 format since 2009, in a new style and with additional content. It covers articles on the latest technologies, interviews, and opinions from market leaders, application stories as well as industry news.

The headquarters of the publication is located in Hattingen, Germany.

Thomas Industrial Media BVBA also publishes other industry publications and websites across Europe.

In English and distributed all across Europe:
Industrial Engineering News Europe (IEN)
Processing and Control News Europe (PCN)
Power In Motion (PIM)
In French and distributed in France:
Produits Equipements Industriels (PEI)
In Italian and distributed in Italy:
Industrial Engineering News Italia (IEN Italia)
Manutenzione Tecnica e Management
Il Distributore Industriale
In Turkish and distributed in Turkey:
Endustri Dunyasi

Circulation
The magazine is free and available only on request for industry professionals. Over 40,000 copies are distributed ten times a year.

External links
Thomas Industrial Media's website
Thomas Publishing Co's website

1982 establishments in Belgium
Magazines published in Belgium
Monthly magazines published in Belgium
Magazines established in 1982
Mass media in Mechelen
Science and technology magazines
German-language magazines